KLBB-LD (channel 48) is a low-power television station in Lubbock, Texas, United States, affiliated with MeTV. Owned by Gray Television, it is a sister station to Gray's duopoly of Lubbock-licensed NBC affiliate KCBD (channel 11) and Wolfforth-licensed CW+ affiliate KLCW-TV (channel 22), as well as three other low-power stations—MyNetworkTV affiliate KMYL-LD (channel 14), Snyder-licensed Heroes & Icons affiliate KABI-LD (channel 42), and Class A Telemundo affiliate KXTQ-CD (channel 46). Gray also operates Fox affiliate KJTV-TV (channel 34) and low-power Class A independent KJTV-CD (channel 32) through a shared services agreement (SSA) with owner SagamoreHill Broadcasting. The stations share studios at 98th Street and University Avenue in south Lubbock, where KLBB-LD's transmitter is also located.

Technical information

Subchannels
The station's digital signal is multiplexed:

References

MeTV affiliates
Movies! affiliates
LBB-LD
Low-power television stations in the United States
Heroes & Icons affiliates
Gray Television